Utkal University (UU) is a Public university in Bhubaneswar, Khordha, Odisha, and is the oldest university in the state, and the 17th-oldest university in India. It is a teaching-cum-affiliating university. The present campus at Vani Vihar located on a sprawling 399.9 acre area in the heart of Bhubaneswar. 

At present the university has twenty-seven Post-Graduate teaching and research departments located within the campus, viz. Directorate of Distance and Continuing Education, University Law College at Vani Vihar. Besides the regular courses, twenty-six sponsored courses are offered under the direct academic control of the P.G. Council of the university. The university is located in the middle of the city. It is 5 km from the airport, 3 km from the railway station. Sainik school is to its north. Mancheswar industrial area is to its east.

In 2016, Utkal University adopted its theme song from "tunga sikhar chula" (1st 3 stanzas) poem of Godabarish Mishra, one of its founder members.

History

After the separation of Odisha from Bihar and the creation of the new province of Odisha in April 1936, there was a strong desire among the leaders of the province for the establishment of a separate university in Odisha. Until 1936, all the colleges were under the jurisdiction of either Patna University or Andhra University. Subsequently, the government of Odisha, with Shri Biswanath Dash as the premier, appointed a committee on 2 March 1938, with Pandit Nilakantha Das as its chairman to examine the possibility of establishing a separate university in Odisha. During the premiership of Maharaja Krushna Chandra Gajapati, who played a pioneering role in the establishment of the university, the recommendation of this committee was made available. Pandit Godavarish Mishra, the then minister of education in the government of Odisha introduced the Utkal University Bill which was passed by the Odisha Legislative Assembly on 30 June 1943. On receiving the Governor's assent subsequently on 2 August 1943, the Utkal University Act 1943 came into force, clearing the way for the foundation of the university on 27 November 1943.

In 1966, that Act was repealed and a new Utkal University Act was passed which came into effect from 1 January 1967. Initially, Utkal University was operating from Ravenshaw College, before it came to its own campus at Bhubaneswar, called Vani Vihar. Ravenshaw College remained affiliated to Patna University even after the separation of Odisha from Bihar in 1936; the affiliation was finally transferred to the newly created Utkal University in 1943. In fact, it was Ravenshaw College that gave birth to the new university, nursed and sustained it. It operated from Ravenshaw College's present Zoology Department building premises. The university has many departments from Anthropology to Zoology for post-graduate teaching. The foundation stone of the present campus was laid by Dr. Rajendra Prasad, the first President of India on 1 January 1958, and the campus was inaugurated by Dr. Sarvepalli Radhakrishnan, the second President of India on 2 January 1963.

Location
The campus is at the heart of Bhubaneswar city and right on Vanivihar NH-16 (old number NH 5). It is nearly 5 km from both the main railway station at Master Canteen and bus stand at Baramunda. All the Postgraduate departments and the law college are inside the campus.

Evolution of the Undergraduate & Postgraduate Departments
The initial Utkal University Act 1943 did not specify clearly the territorial jurisdiction of the university. However, its jurisdiction was extended to include the princely states in Odisha by an agreement between the rulers of these princely states and the Government of Odisha. According to the agreement, adequate representation of the princely states in the administrative and academic bodies of the university (15 members in the Senate, one member each in the Syndicate and the Academic Council) was granted. The Utkal University Act 1943 was accordingly amended in 1947 defining the territorial jurisdiction of the university which was subsequently extended further to the whole State of Odisha in 1950.

Prana Krushna Parija, principal of Ravenshaw College, Cuttack was the first vice-chancellor of the university. V. V. John, the assistant professor of English in Ravenshaw College was the first registrar. The university, to start with, functioned mainly as an affiliating body. In 1949, it took over the management of the undergraduate department of law from Ravenshaw College, Cuttack, and established its first constituent college now known as Madhusudan Law College, Cuttack.

In 1956, the second phase of its expansion began with the opening of the post-graduate Department of Geology in Ravenshaw College campus and the University College of Engineering, Burla, Sambalpur. A research department of Rural Economics and Sociology was started the same year with a generous grant from the Ford Foundation. In 1957, two new post-graduate departments in Philosophy and Sanskrit were established on the premises of the Burdwan House at Cuttack. That year the university office was shifted to the Circuit House at Cuttack. The university, in the initial phases, provided new facilities for post-graduate studies only in those subjects which did not exist in Ravenshaw College at that time.

In 1958, the post-graduate departments of Psychology, Statistics, Political Science, and Anthropology were established. While the first three departments were housed on the premises of Ravenshaw College, the Department of Anthropology was accommodated in a rented house at Bhubaneswar. The university took over the Post-graduate Department of History from Ravenshaw College in 1959. Post-Graduate studies in Zoology and Commerce were introduced in 1960 and 1962 respectively. The Research Department of Rural Economics and Sociology was established in 1956, and Post-Graduate courses in Applied Economics were started in 1963. It was subsequently renamed as the Department of Analytical and Applied Economics. Around that time, a movement for the creation of regional universities started in different parts of Odisha. Accordingly, the Government of Odisha appointed the State University Committee in 1962 with Dr. P. Parija, the then Vice-Chancellor of Utkal University as the chairman.

On the recommendation of the committee, two more universities were created; one at Sambalpur and the other at Berhampur. The Utkal University Act 1943 was, in consequence, suitably amended to meet the new situation. The two new universities at Sambalpur and Berhampur came into existence with effect from 1 January 1967; the date from which the new Utkal University Act came into force. The jurisdiction of Utkal University, which earlier covered the whole state of Odisha, was redefined in the new legislation. After the establishment of the two new Universities, the management of the evening colleges at Cuttack, Bhubaneswar, Sambalpur and Berhampur were taken over by the State Government. The Engineering College at Burla was handed over to Sambalpur University. Utkal University, in its new campus at Vani Vihar, opened few other Post-Graduate departments such as Mathematics, Physics, Chemistry, Botany, Oriya and English during the years 1966–69. The Department of Sociology and Labour Welfare was started in 1970, which in 1974 was split into the Department of Sociology, and the Department of Labour Welfare (now renamed as the Department of Personnel Management and Industrial Relations). The Department of Geography was opened in 1970. The Post-Graduate Department of Law (L.L.M.) was started in 1973.

Dr. Baidyanath Misra, the head of the department of Analytical & Applied Economics, instituted two academic chairs, funded by the Reserve Bank of India and the State Bank of India at the university.

The Department of Geology, which was accommodated earlier in Ravenshaw College was shifted to Vani Vihar in 1977. Then the department of Library and Information Science and that of and Political Science Departments respectively, besides the 27 regular Post Graduate Programmes, along with Business Administration were opened in 1981 and in 1984 respectively. A Computer centre was established initially with different departments of the university. IBM-1130 computers were donated by the University Grants Commission in the year 1970 which has subsequently been placed by the WIPRO LANDMARK system at a cost of Rs. 16 lakh provided later by the University Grants Commission. The computer centre, while facilitating research work undertaken by various departments of the university earlier offered a Post-Graduate Diploma Course on Computer Application (DCA) from 1980 to 1997. In 1990, the university opened the Department of Computer Science and Applications.

In 1999, the university came up with integrated MCA course, which is a 5-year post-graduation course after the 12th (10+2) standard. This course was very popular as students got placement with multi-national companies after completing it.

University Department of Pharmaceutical Sciences (Department of Pharmacy)

Year of Establishment : 2000. It is the only government(self financed) college in Odisha to provide the B. Pharm degree programme.

It provide the various courses like Bachelor of Pharmacy(B.Pharm), Masters of Pharmacy(M.Pharm) with the specializations Pharmaceutics, Pharmaceutical Chemistry, Pharmacology, Pharmacognosy( Herbal drug Technology) as well as P.hD in Pharmacy degree.

In 2001, the M.Sc. Computer Science course was started which was based on entrance selection test. The enrolled students were required to have prior Computer Science degree at the graduate level. This course become hugely successful with good student background, contemporary course structure, and excellent placement record.

The Post Graduate Department of Biotechnology was started in 2002, and offers M.Sc. in Biotechnology which is sponsored by the Department of Biotechnology, Government of India, New Delhi. The Department was established by Prof. G. B. N. Chainy, the former Head of Dept. of Zoology and Biotechnology, Utkal University. Most of the modern biochemical and molecular instrumentation facilities are available here to support the research work. This Department offers Ph.D. and M.Sc. courses in different subject areas of Biotechnology.

The post graduate Department of Zoology is one of the oldest department in the university. The Department offers P.G., M.Phil. and Ph.D. courses on a regular basis and M.Sc. in Fisheries as a self financed 2-year course. Many eminent Zoologist had headed the Department and the research in the Department is one of the substantial output of the university. People have published their research findings in most reputed Journals such as Nature, Comparative Biochemistry and Physiology, Life Sciences, Chemico-Biological Interactions, Ecotoxicology and Environmental Safety and Journal of Environmental Biology. This Department has published the highest numbers on international publications among all the other departments of the university. Some of the leading authors are Prof. GBN Chainy, Prof. SK Dutta, Prof. SP Bhuyna, Dr. Luna Samanta and Dr. Biswaranjan Paital. Currently, due to the shortage of staffs both the teaching and research activities are greatly affected.

Residential student halls
The university has separate residential accommodation for men and women students. The men's hostels include Gopabandhu Chatrabas, Madhusudan Chhatrabas and Fakir Mohan Chhatrabas, Godabarish Chhatrabas, Nilakantha Chhatrabas & Acharya Harihar Chhatrabas.

Academic and co-curricular facilities
The central library of the university is named "Parija Library" after the eminent botanical scientist Prana Krushna Parija. The Distance Education Centre of Utkal University known as DDCE UTKAL UNIVERSITY is very popular for quality distance education in the state of Odisha. It offers Graduation courses like B.A. and M.A. in the subjects, such as Odia, Political Science, Hindi, Education, Sanskrit, Sociology, and English.

Rankings 
Utkal University ranked 88th among universities by National Institutional Ranking Framework (NIRF) in 2022.

Accreditation 
Utkal University was accredited A+ grade with CGPA of 3.53 upon 4 by the National Assessment and Accreditation Council (NAAC) in the Second cycle.

Affiliated colleges
The university has now the jurisdiction over 9 districts, viz, Angul, Cuttack, Dhenkanal, Jajpur, Jagatsinghpur, Kendrapara, Khurda, Nayagarh and Puri.

Notable alumni

Subroto Bagchi, Indian entrepreneur and a Business leader, co-founder of Mindtree
Lokanath Behera, State Police Chief, Government of Kerala
T. K. Chand, Chairman cum Managing Director of National Aluminium Company
Hussain Rabi Gandhi, Odia poet, writer and politician 
Bhanu Pratap Jena, Scientist and pioneer Cell Biologist and Chemist, Discoverer of the “Porosome -a new cell structure”
Madhu Sudan Kanungo, scientist in gerontology and neuroscience and winner of Padma Shri award
Harun Rashid Khan, Deputy Governor, Reserve Bank of India
Sitakant Mahapatra, Indian poet and winner of Padma Bhusan and Padma Bibhusan
 Baidyanath Misra - former Vice-Chancellor of the Odisha University of Agriculture and Technology, Chairman of Odisha State Planning Board and Chairman of Odisha's First State Finance Commission.
Hara P. Misra, biochemist based in USA
Subrata K. Mitra, political scientist and editor of Heidelberg papers of South Asia
Bedangadas Mohanty, physicist, NISER, BBSR Director, Shanti Swarup Bhatnagar laureate (2015)
Kumkum Mohanty, Odishi dancer and winner of Padma Shri and Sangeet Natak Akademi award
Uma Charan Mohanty, meteorologist, Shanti Swarup Bhatnagar laureate
Sangita Mukhopadhyay, Molecular cell biologist, N-Bios laureate
G. C. Murmu, Comptroller and Auditor General of India, former Lieutenant Governor of Jammu and Kashmir
Oopali Operajita, Distinguished Fellow, Carnegie Mellon University; Odissi and Bharatanatyam artist; Advisor to Indian Parliamentarians 
Subrat Kumar Panda, virologist, Shanti Swarup Bhatnagar laureate
 Amulya Patnaik, Delhi Commissioner of Police
Janaki Ballabh Patnaik, former Chief Minister of Odisha and the former Governor of Assam
Jayanti Patnaik, member of parliament, author and editor
Gopal Ballav Pattanaik, former Chief Justice of India
Dharmendra Pradhan, former minister of Petroleum & Natural Gas and Minister of Steel,(Present) Minister of Education, Govt of India
Manasi Pradhan, eminent women activist and former National Commission for Women Member
Tapan Kumar Pradhan, activist, banker and poet
Debapratim Purkayastha, Indian educator
Bhakta B. Rath, material physicist and Padma Bhushan recipient
Sarojini Sahoo, feminist writer, Sahitya Akademi award winner and editor of India AGE
Achyuta Samanta, Social Worker and Educationalist, Founder of KIIT, KISS and KIMS.
Mihir Sen, first Asian to swim the English Channel in 1958, and the first swimmer to have crossed the Palk Straits in 1966
Raghunathan Srianand, Physicist, Astrophysicist, Cosmologist Shanti Swarup Bhatnagar laureate (2008)

References

External links

Utkal University, Bhubaneswar

Utkal University
Universities in Bhubaneswar
Department of Higher Education, Odisha
Educational institutions established in 1943
1943 establishments in India